
Gmina Przerośl is a rural gmina (administrative district) in Suwałki County, Podlaskie Voivodeship, in north-eastern Poland.

The gmina contains part of the protected area called Suwałki Landscape Park.

Villages
Gmina Przerośl contains the villages and settlements of Blenda, Bućki, Hańcza, Iwaniszki, Kolonia Przerośl, Kruszki, Krzywólka, Łanowicze Duże, Łanowicze Małe, Morgi, Nowa Pawłówka, Nowa Przerośl, Olszanka, Prawy Las, Przełomka, Przerośl, Przystajne, Rakówek, Romanówka, Śmieciuchówka, Stara Pawłówka, Wersele, Zarzecze and Zusienko.

Neighbouring gminas
Gmina Przerośl is bordered by the gminas of Dubeninki, Filipów, Jeleniewo, Suwałki and Wiżajny.

References
Polish official population figures 2006

Przerosl
Suwałki County